These are tables of congressional delegations from West Virginia to the United States House of Representatives and the United States Senate.

The current dean of the West Virginia delegation is Senator Shelley Moore Capito, having served in the Senate since 2015 and in Congress since 2001.

From June 1861 to June 1863, during the Civil War and before West Virginia statehood, the United States recognized the Restored Government of Virginia sitting in Wheeling as the "legitimate," pro-Union government of Virginia. Also called the Reorganized Government of Virginia, it controlled a contiguous area roughly the same as present-day West Virginia, along with parts of Northern Virginia and Tidewater. The rest of Virginia was under Confederate military control, with a state government in Richmond, and did not send representatives to Congress. The legislature in Wheeling chose two U.S. Senators for Virginia, John S. Carlile and Waitman T. Willey, who were seated by the Senate. Three U.S. Representatives elected in western districts of Virginia also went to Congress in 1861: Jacob B. Blair, William G. Brown, and Kellian V. Whaley. In 1861, as one of its first acts, the Restored Government began the process of creating the new state of West Virginia, which was achieved in 1863. The Restored Government of Virginia then moved to Alexandria.

U.S. House of Representatives

Current members 
List of current members of the delegation, their terms in office, district boundaries, and the district political ratings according to the Cook Partisan Voting Index. The delegation has 2 members,  both Republicans.

Delegation timeline (1863 – present)

United States Senate

Key

See also

List of United States congressional districts
West Virginia's congressional districts 
Political party strength in West Virginia

References 

 
 
West Virginia
Politics of West Virginia
Congressional delegations